This is a list of episodes for The Hardy Boys/Nancy Drew Mysteries, a television series which aired for three seasons on ABC.

Series overview
{| class=wikitable style="text-align:center"
! colspan=2| Season
! Episodes
! First aired
! Last aired
! Rank
! Nielsen ratings
|-
| style="width:5px; background:#FFA500"|
| 1
| 14
| January 30, 1977
| May 22, 1977
| #61
| 17.2
|-
| bgcolor="00A3C8"|
| 2
| 22
| September 11, 1977
| May 7, 1978
| #69
| 15.8
|-
| bgcolor="B30713"|
| 3
| 10
| October 1, 1978
| January 14, 1979
| #92
| 13.0
|-
|}

Episodes

Season 1 (1977)
Season 1 featured 7 Hardy Boys episodes, and 7 Nancy Drew episodes.  There were no crossover episodes during this season.

Season 2 (1977–78)
Season 2 featured 11 Hardy Boys episodes, 3 Nancy Drew episodes and 8 crossover episodes in which all three characters appeared.  All three solo Nancy Drew episodes featured Pamela Sue Martin, as did four of the crossover episodes.  The remaining four crossover episodes, all airing towards the end of the season, featured Janet Louise Johnson as Nancy Drew.

Season 3 (1978–79)
The series is retitled The Hardy Boys for this season.  All 10 episodes feature the Hardy Boys only, as the character of Nancy Drew is dropped.

References

External links

 

Hardy Boys Nancy Drew Mysteries
Television shows based on The Hardy Boys
Television shows based on Nancy Drew